Netball at the 1963 South Pacific Games in Suva, Fiji was held from 30 August to 4 September 1963.

Format

The five teams played a single round-robin, with medals awarded to the top-placed three teams.

Results

Final standings

Matches

Placings

See also
 Netball at the Pacific Games

References

1963 Pacific Games
South Pacific Games
Netball at the Pacific Games
South Pacific